Kim Meylemans (born 7 March 1996) is a German-born Belgian skeleton racer who competes on the Skeleton World Cup. After starting out in football, she began competing in skeleton in 2009 and was selected to the German national team in 2013.  In the 2014–15 season, she moved to the Belgium national team.  She is coached by Fernando Oliva (personal coach) and Martin Rettl (team coach), and rides a Schneider sled.

Notable results 
Meylemans finished in fifth place at the IBSF World Championships 2017 in Königssee, and placed 14th in the 2016 championships at Igls.  In the 2017 European championships, Meylemans finished 9th. Her best finish on the World Cup circuit was 5th place at Whistler in 2017.

Personal life 
Meylemans is in a relationship with fellow skeleton racer Nicole Silveira.

References

External links 

1996 births
Living people
Belgian female skeleton racers
German female skeleton racers
Skeleton racers at the 2012 Winter Youth Olympics
Skeleton racers at the 2018 Winter Olympics
Skeleton racers at the 2022 Winter Olympics
Olympic skeleton racers of Belgium
Belgium LGBT sportspeople
People from Amberg
Sportspeople from the Upper Palatinate
Lesbian sportswomen
LGBT skeleton racers